Tipulamima is a genus of moths in the family Sesiidae.

Species
Tipulamima aristura (Meyrick, 1931)
Tipulamima auronitens (Le Cerf, 1913)
Tipulamima festiva (Beutenmüller, 1899)
Tipulamima flammipes (Hampson, 1910)
Tipulamima flavifrons  Holland, 1893
Tipulamima grandidieri (Le Cerf, 1917)
Tipulamima haugi (Le Cerf, 1917)
Tipulamima hypocalla  Le Cerf, 1937
Tipulamima ivondro  Viette, [1955]
Tipulamima malimba (Beutenmüller, 1899)
Tipulamima nigriceps  Hampson, 1919
Tipulamima opalimargo (Le Cerf, 1913)
Tipulamima pedunculata (Hampson, 1910)
Tipulamima pyrosoma  Hampson, 1919
Tipulamima sexualis (Hampson, 1910)
Tipulamima seyrigi  Viette, [1955]
Tipulamima sophax (Druce, 1899)
Tipulamima sylvestralis (Viette, [1955])
Tipulamima tricincta (Le Cerf, 1916)
Tipulamima xanthopimplaeformis (Viette, [1955])

References

Sesiidae